Gurpreet Singh is an Indian TV and film actor. He replaced Rajeev Khandelwal in Kahiin to Hoga on Star Plus.

He has acted in Phhir produced by Vikram Bhatt, Madhubala and Bhayy. He has also acted in other TV serials like Saarrthi on Star Plus,  Maayka on Zee tv and Durgesh Nandinii on Sony TV. He has also featured in a music video Sajanwa, directed by Anurag Basu.

Personal life 
Gurpreet Singh was born on 28 November 1978 in a Sikh family in New Delhi. The role which gave Gurpreet his major breakthrough and is well known for his role of Sujal Garewal from the popular serial Kahiin to hoga on Star Plus channel. He married Punjabi music video model Kanishka Sodhi aka Gurpreet kaur sodhi in 2005 and filed for divorce in 2010 and got divorced in 2021.

Filmography

Television

References

Living people
Indian male television actors
Indian male film actors
1978 births
Indian male soap opera actors
People from New Delhi